Haliestes is a genus of sea spider from the Silurian aged Coalbrookdale Formation of England. It contains a single species, Haliestes dasos. The species was first described by David Siveter et al. in 2004.

References

Pycnogonids